The 1959 Coppa Italia Final was the final of the 1958–59 Coppa Italia. The match was played on 13 September 1959 between Internazionale and Juventus. Juventus won 4–1; it was their third victory.

Match

References 
Coppa Italia 1958/59 statistics at rsssf.com
 https://www.calcio.com/calendario/ita-coppa-italia-1958-1959-finale/2/
 https://www.worldfootball.net/schedule/ita-coppa-italia-1958-1959-finale/2/

Coppa Italia Finals
Coppa Italia Final 1959
Coppa Italia Final 1959